Candalides afretta is a species of butterfly of the family Lycaenidae. It was described by Parsons in 1986. It is found in Papua New Guinea.

References

Candalidini
Butterflies described in 1986